Half nut may refer to: 

In mechanical engineering:

 A half-thickness nut, used as a locknut or jam nut
 A split nut